This is an incomplete list of ghost towns in New Jersey.

 Batsto Village, in Burlington County, a ghost town later transformed into an outdoor museum. 
 Double Trouble, in Ocean County.
 Feltville Historic District, in Union County. 
 Island Beach, in Ocean County.
 Millbrook Village, in the Delaware Water Gap National Recreation Area in Warren County.
 Ong's Hat, in Burlington County.
 Raritan Landing, in Middlesex County.
 South Cape May, in Cape May County. 
 Walpack Center, in the Delaware Water Gap National Recreation Area in Sussex County.
 Whitesbog Village, in Burlington and Ocean counties.

New Jersey
Ghost towns